

Field is a locality in the Australian state of South Australia located in the state’s south-east about  south-east of the state capital of Adelaide and about  south-east of the municipal seat in Tailem Bend.

Its boundaries were created on 24 August 2000.  Its name is derived from the cadastral unit of the Hundred of Field.

The majority land use within Field is ’primary production’ and is concerned with “agricultural production.”  Some land in its south-east corner which is occupied by the Mount Boothby Conservation Park is zoned for ‘conservation’.

The 2016 Australian census which was conducted in August 2016 reports that Field had a population of 79 people.

Field is located within the federal division of Barker, the state electoral district of MacKillop and the local government area of the Coorong District Council.

References

 

Towns in South Australia